The Eurasian beaver (Castor fiber) or European beaver is a beaver species that was once widespread in Eurasia, but was hunted to near-extinction for both its fur and castoreum. At the turn of the 20th century, only about 1,200 beavers survived in eight relict populations in Europe and Asia. It has been reintroduced to much of its former range, and now occurs from Spain, Central Europe, Great Britain and Scandinavia to a few regions in China and Mongolia. It is listed as least concern on the IUCN Red List, as it recovered well in most of Europe. It is extirpated in Portugal, Moldova, and Turkey.

Taxonomy
Castor fiber was the scientific name used by Carl Linnaeus in 1758, who described the beaver in his work Systema Naturae. Between 1792 and 1997, several Eurasian beaver zoological specimens were described and proposed as subspecies, including:
C. f. albus and C. f. solitarius by Robert Kerr in 1792
C. f. fulvus and C. f. variegatus by Johann Matthäus Bechstein in 1801
C. f. galliae by Étienne Geoffroy Saint-Hilaire in 1803
C. f. flavus, C. f. varius and C. f. niger by Anselme Gaëtan Desmarest in 1822
C. f. gallicus Johann Baptist Fischer in 1829
C. f. proprius by Gustaf Johan Billberg in 1833
C. f. albicus, C. f. balticus and C. f. vistulanus by Paul Matschie in 1907
C. f. birulai and C. f. pohlei by Serebrennikov in 1929
C. f. tuvinicus by Lavrov in 1969
C. f. belarusicus and C. f. osteuropaeus by Lavrov in 1974
C. f. belorussicus  and C. f. orientoeuropaeus by Lavrov in 1981
C. f. bielorussieus by Lavrov in 1983
C. f. introductus by Saveljev in 1997
These descriptions were largely based on very small differences in fur colour and cranial morphology, none of which warrant a subspecific distinction.
In 2005, analysis of mitochondrial DNA of Eurasian beaver samples showed that only two evolutionarily significant units exist: a western phylogroup in Western and Central Europe, and an eastern phylogroup in the region east of the Oder and Vistula rivers. The eastern phylogroup is genetically more diverse, but still at a degree below thresholds considered sufficient for subspecific differentiation.

Description
The Eurasian beaver's fur colour varies between regions. Light, chestnut-rust is the dominant colour in Belarus. In Russia's Sozh River basin, it is predominantly blackish brown, while in the Voronezh Reserve beavers are both brown and blackish-brown.

The Eurasian beaver is one of the largest living rodent species and the largest rodent native to Eurasia. In Norway, adult males average , while females average . Adults from the same country average . By the average weights known, it appears to be the world's second heaviest rodent after the capybara, and is slightly larger and heavier than the North American beaver.

Differences from North American beaver

Although the Eurasian beaver appears superficially similar to the North American beaver, there are several important differences, chief among these being that the North American beaver has 40 chromosomes, while the Eurasian beaver has 48. The two species are not genetically compatible: After more than 27 attempts in Russia to hybridise the two species, the result was one stillborn kit that was bred from the pairing of a male North American beaver and a female Eurasian beaver. The difference in chromosome count makes interspecific breeding unlikely in areas where the two species' ranges overlap.

Fur 
The guard hairs of the Eurasian beaver have longer hollow medullae at their tips. There is also a difference in the frequency of fur colours: 66% of Eurasian beavers overall have beige or pale brown fur, 20% have reddish brown, nearly 8% are brown, and only 4% have blackish coats; among North American beavers, 50% have pale brown fur, 25% are reddish brown, 20% are brown, and 6% are blackish.

Head 
The Eurasian beaver has a larger, less rounded head; a longer, narrower muzzle. The Eurasian beaver also has longer nasal bones, with the widest point being at the end of the snout; in the case of the North American beaver, the widest point is at the middle of the snout. The Eurasian beaver has a triangular nasal opening, unlike those of the North American beavers, which are square. Furthermore, the foramen magnum is rounded in the Eurasian beaver, but triangular in the North American beaver.

Body 
The Eurasian beaver has shorter shin bones than the North American species and a narrower, less oval-shaped tail, making it less capable of bipedal locomotion. The anal glands of the Eurasian beaver are larger, and thin-walled, with a large internal volume, relative to that of the North American beaver.

Behaviour and ecology

The Eurasian beaver is a keystone species, as it helps to support the ecosystem which it inhabits. It creates wetlands, which provide habitat for European water vole, Eurasian otter and Eurasian water shrew. By coppicing waterside trees and shrubs it facilitates their regrowth as dense shrubs, thus providing cover for birds and other animals. Beavers build dams that trap sediment, improve water quality, recharge groundwater tables and increase cover and forage for trout and salmon. Also, abundance and diversity of vespertilionid bats increase, apparently because of gaps created in forests, making it easier for bats to navigate.

Reproduction

Eurasian beavers have one litter per year, coming into estrus for only 12 to 24 hours, between late December and May, but peaking in January. Unlike most other rodents, beaver pairs are monogamous, staying together for multiple breeding seasons. Gestation averages 107 days and they average three kits per litter with a range of two to six kits. Most beavers do not reproduce until they are three years of age, but about 20% of two-year-old females reproduce.

Diet
European beavers are herbivorous, eating "water and river bank plants", including tubers, "rootstocks of myrtles, cattails, water lilies", and also trees, including softwood tree bark. Their long appendices and the microorganisms within make possible the digestion of bark cellulose. Their daily food intake is approximately 20% of their body weight.

Distribution and habitat
The Eurasian beaver is recovering from near extinction, after depredation by humans for its fur and for castoreum, a secretion of its scent gland believed to have medicinal properties. The estimated population was only 1,200 by the early 20th century. In many European nations, the Eurasian beaver became extinct, but reintroduction and protection programmes led to gradual recovery so that by 2003, the population comprised about 639,000 individuals. It likely survived east of the Ural Mountains from a 19th-century population as low as 300 animals. Factors contributing to their survival include their ability to maintain sufficient genetic diversity to recover from a population as low as three individuals, and that beavers are monogamous and select mates that are genetically different from themselves. About 83% of Eurasian beavers live in the former Soviet Union due to reintroductions.

Continental Europe

In 2004, 18 European beavers were detected between Milagro and Alfaro, Spain, in the Ebro river near the Navarre-La Rioja border. An investigation determined that the animals proceeded from farms in Bavaria and were released in March 2003, though the people responsible were never identified. The regional governments attempted to remove the animals, receiving criticism from conservation groups who defended that the European beaver is a Iberian native with a fossil history of 1,4 million years and historical references in Spain until around 1583. After consulting with the European Union, the removal plans were terminated. By 2020, beavers had colonized the Ebro in La Rioja, Navarre, and Zaragoza; the Zadorra river up to Vitoria-Gasteiz, the Arga up to Pamplona, the Huerva up to Mezalocha, and the Jalón into the province of Soria. In November 2021, a young beaver was photographed for the first time outside of the Ebro basin, in the upper Duero in Soria.

In France, the Eurasian beaver was almost extirpated by the late 19th century, with only a small population of about 100 individuals surviving in the lower Rhône valley. Following protection measures in 1968 and 26 reintroduction projects, it re-colonized the Rhône river and other river systems in the country such as Loire, Saône, Moselle, Tarn and Seine rivers. In 2011, the French beaver population was estimated at 14,000 individuals living along  watercourses.

In Germany, around 200 Eurasian beavers survived by the end of the 19th century in the Elbe river system in Saxony, Saxony-Anhalt and Brandenburg. By 2019, beavers numbered above 40,000 across Germany, even appearing in many urban areas.  The largest beaver population lives in eastern Germany with about 6,000 individuals descended from Elbe beavers, and in Bavaria along the Danube and its tributaries. After a resettlement programme started in 1966, around 14,000 individuals are estimated in Bavaria.

In Switzerland, the Eurasian beaver was extirpated in the early 19th century due to hunting for its fur, meat and castoreum. Between 1956 and 1977, 141 individuals were reintroduced to 30 sites in the Rhone and Rhine catchment areas. They originated in France, Russia and Norway. As of 2019, an estimated 3,500 beavers were living in Switzerland (a sharp increase from 1,600 beavers in 2008), with permanent beaver presence along most larger rivers of the Swiss plateau and the Swiss Alps (with the exception of Ticino).

Beavers were reintroduced in the Netherlands in 1988 after being completely exterminated in the 19th century. After its reintroduction in the Biesbosch, the Dutch population has spread considerably (supported by additional reintroductions), and can now be found in the Biesbosch and surrounding areas, along the Meuse in Limburg, and in the Gelderse Poort and Oostvaardersplassen. In 2012, the population was estimated to be about 600 animals and could easily grow to 7000 in 20 years' time. According to the Mammal Society and the Dutch Water Board, this will cause a threat to the river dikes. The main problem is that beavers excavate corridors and caves in dikes, thereby undermining the stability of the dike, just as the muskrat and the coypu do. If problems become unmanageable, as local administrators in Limburg fear, the beaver will be captured again.

As of 2014, the beaver population in Poland reached 100,000 individuals. and was still growing. After major flooding in Poland in May and June 2010, the local authorities of Konin in central Poland held beavers responsible for causing the flooding and demanded the culling of 150 beavers.

In Romania, beavers became extinct in 1824, but were reintroduced in 1998 along the Olt River, spreading to other rivers in Covasna County. In 2014, the animals were confirmed to have reached the Danube Delta.

By 1917, beavers remained in Russia in 4 isolated territories: in the Dnieper basin; in the Don basin along the tributaries of the Voronezh; in the northern Urals and in the upper reaches of the Yenisei along the Azas River. The total number of beavers did not exceed 800-900 heads. Since 1922, hunting them has been universally prohibited. In 1923, a hunting reserve was organized in the Voronezh region along the Usman River, which in 1927 was transformed into the Voronezh State Reserve. At the same time, two more reserves were created: Berezinsky and Kondo-Sosvinsky. Their main task was to protect the beavers and restore their numbers. Since 1927, the first attempts to resettle beavers began. As a result of the measures taken, by the end of the 1960s, the beaver in the USSR settled in an area almost equal in area to the range of the 17th century. The increased number of beavers made it possible to organize their commercial capture again. In 2016, there were 661,000 beavers in Russia. In 2019, the population of these animals amounted to 774.6 thousand individuals.

In the former Soviet Union, almost 17,000 beavers were translocated from 1927 to 2004, of which 12,000 were to Russia, and the remainder to Ukraine, Belarus, the Baltic States, and Kazakhstan. The beaver is now common in Estonia and Latvia.

In Greece, the Eurasian beaver was present in the Last Glacial Period as remains were found in Epirus. In the Holocene, during the Neolithic remains were found in coastal Evros and Argura, during the Neolithic to Bronze Age transition in Ptolemaida basin and Sitagroi and during Early Helladic II in northeastern Peloponnese. In 4th century BCE Aristotle described this species under the name Λάταξ/Latax. He wrote that it is wider than the otter, with strong teeth and that it gets often in the night to the river banks to cut down trees with these teeth. Ιt remains unclear when they vanished from Kastoria which was possibly named after Kastor/Castor which means beaver, but in the 18th century CE the locals were still hunting them for their fur. Buffon also wrote that they were very rare in Greece during his time (18th century). In the 19th century, it still occurred in Alpheius in the Peloponnese and in Mesolongi.

In Bulgaria, fossil, subfossil and subrecent remains were found in 43 localities along 28 Bulgarian lowland (till 550 m a.s.l.) rivers, ranging from Struma and Maritsa in the south till the Danube in the north, while the last data from Nicopolis ad Istrum date to the 1750-1850 period. In 2021 the Eurasian beaver was confirmed to have returned in Bulgaria.

In Serbia, beavers were mainly extinct by the 1870s, the last specimens being spotted in the 1900-1902 period. Four families with five members each, plus 11 single animals (31 in total) were reintroduced in 2004 in the Zasavica reserve, by the Biology Faculty of the Belgrade University in collaboration with the Bavarian Science Society. Additional 45 animals were released in the Obedska bara reserve. They began building dams and to reproduce almost right away.

In 2018, beavers returned to Italy after an absence of almost 500 years, when they were spotted in the Friuli-Venezia Giulia region.

The recently resurgent beaver population in Eurasia has resulted in increases in human-beaver encounters. Indeed, in May 2013, a Belarusian fisherman died after being bitten several times by a beaver, severing an artery in his leg and causing him to bleed to death.

Nordics
In Denmark, the Eurasian beaver appears to have become extinct 2000-2500 years ago, although a small population might have survived into the 1st millennium AD. In 1999, 18 Eurasian beavers were reintroduced to the Flynder creek in the Klosterhede Plantage state forest in west-central Jutland, Denmark, that originated from Elbe river in Germany. At Arresø in northern Zealand, 23 Eurasian beavers were reintroduced between 2009 and 2011. By 2019, it was estimated that the Jutland population had increased to 240-270 individuals and it had spread well beyond the region where first introduced, with records ranging from Hanstholm in north to Varde and Kolding in south. The population in northern Zealand, which had yet to significantly expand its geographic range beyond the region where first introduced, had increased to 50-60 individuals in 2019.

In southern Norway, there was still a natural population of Eurasian beavers in the early 1900s, which was one of a few surviving in Europe at that time. Following protection, the Norwegian range of the species has expanded.

In Sweden, the Eurasian beaver had been hunted to extinction by around 1870. Between 1922 and 1939, about 80 individuals were imported from Norway and introduced to 19 separate sites within the country. Beavers were reintroduced to central Norway's Ingdalselva River watershed on the Agdenes peninsula in Sør-Trøndelag County in 1968–1969. The area is hilly to mountainous with many small watersheds. Rivers are usually too steep along most of their length for beaver colonisation, so that suitable habitat is scattered, with rarely room for more than one territory in a habitat patch. While widespread signs of vagrant beavers were found, spread as a breeding animal was slowed by watershed divides in the hilly terrain. Suitable sites within watersheds were rapidly colonised. Some spread could only be plausibly explained by assuming travel through sheltered sea water in fjords.

Eurasian beavers are present in Finland, both having spread from adjacent Sweden and the result of local reintroductions, but most of the Finnish population is a released North American beaver population. The population of the latter species is controlled to prevent them from spreading into areas inhabited by Eurasian beavers.

United Kingdom

The Eurasian beaver became extinct in Britain in the 16th century. The last reference to beavers in England dates to 1526.
A population of Eurasian beaver of unknown origin has been present on the River Otter, Devon in south-west England since 2008. An additional pair was released to increase genetic diversity in 2016. As part of a scientific study, a pair of Eurasian beaver was released in 2011 into a 3 ha fenced enclosure near Dartmoor in southern Devon. The 13 beaver ponds now in place impacted flooding to the extent of releasing precipitation over days to weeks instead of hours.
Free-living beaver populations also occur around the River Tay and Knapdale areas in Scotland. The Knapdale population was released by the Scottish Wildlife Trust and the Royal Zoological Society of Scotland, while the other populations are of unknown origin. Sixteen beavers were released between 2009 and 2014 in Knapdale forest, Argyll. In 2016, the Scottish government declared that the beaver populations in Knapdale and Tayside could remain and naturally expand. This is the first successful reintroduction of a wild mammal in the United Kingdom.
In 2019, a beaver pair was reintroduced in East Anglia for the first time. The four hectare enclosure on a farm in North Essex is part of a flood risk reduction project designed to reduce property flooding. The impact on flooding, wildlife and rural tourism is monitored by a private landowner. In 2022, they were legally protected in England, "making it illegal to capture, kill, injure or disturb them."

Asia 
In Iraq, Iran, Syria, and Turkey, subfossil evidence of beavers extends down to the floodplains of the Tigris-Euphrates basin, and a carved stone stela dating between 1,000 and 800 BC in the Tell Halaf archaeological site along the Khabur River in northeastern Syria depicts a beaver. Although accounts of 19th-century European visitors to the Middle East appear to confuse beavers with otters, a 20th-century report of beavers by Hans Kummerlöwe in the Ceyhan River drainage of southern Turkey includes the diagnostic red incisor teeth, flat, scaly tail, and presence of gnawed willow stems. According to the Encyclopaedia Iranica, early Iranian Avestan and Pahlavi, and later Islamic literature, all reveal different words for otter and beaver, and castoreum was highly valued. Johannes Ludwijk Schlimmer, a noted Dutch physician in 19th-century Iran reported beavers below the confluence of the Tigris and the Euphrates in small numbers, along the bank of the Shatt al-Arab in the provinces of Shushtar and Dezful. Austen Layard reported finding beavers during his visit to the Kabur River in Syria the 1850s, but noted they were being rapidly hunted to extirpation. Beavers were specifically sacred to Zoroastrianism (which also revered otters), and there were laws in place for unlawful killing of these animals.

In China, a few hundred beavers live in the basin of the Ulungur River near the international border with Mongolia. The Bulgan Beaver Nature Reserve was established in 1980 to protect the creatures.

Conservation 

The Eurasian beaver Castor fiber was once widespread in Europe and Asia but by the beginning of the 20th century both the numbers and range of the species had been drastically diminished, mainly due to hunting. At this time, the global population was estimated to be around 1,200 individuals, living in eight separate sub-populations. Conservation of the Eurasian Beaver began in 1923 in the USSR, with the establishment of the Voronezh Nature Reserve. From 1934 to 1977, approximately 3,000 Eurasian Beavers from Voronezh were reintroduced to 52 regions of the USSR, from Poland to Mongolia. In 2008, the IUCN granted the Eurasian Beaver a status of least concern, with the justification that the species had recovered sufficiently with the help of global conservation programmes. Currently the largest numbers can be found across Europe, where reintroductions have been successful in 25 countries and conservation efforts are ongoing. However, populations in Asia remain small and fragmented, and are under considerable threat.

Reintroduction into Scotland 
The first sustained and significant population of wild-living beavers in the United Kingdom became established on the river Tay catchment in Scotland as early as 2001, and spread widely in the catchment, numbering from 20 to 100 individuals. Because these beavers were either escapees from any of several nearby sites with captive beavers, or illegal releases, Scottish Natural Heritage initially planned to remove the Tayside beavers in late 2010. Proponents of the beavers argued that no reason existed to believe that they were of "wrong" genetic stock, and that they should be permitted to remain. One beaver was trapped by Scottish Natural Heritage on the River Ericht in Blairgowrie, Perthshire, in early December 2010, and was held in captivity in the Edinburgh Zoo. In March 2012 the Scottish Government reversed the decision to remove beavers from the Tay, pending the outcome of studies into the suitability of reintroduction.

In 2005, the Scottish government had turned down a licence application for unfenced reintroduction.  However, in late 2007, a further application was made by the Royal Zoological Society of Scotland, Scottish Wildlife Trust and Forestry Commission Scotland for a release project in Knapdale, Argyll. This application, termed the Scottish Beaver Trial, was accepted, and the first beavers were released on 29 May 2009 after a 400-year absence, with further releases in 2010. In August 2010, at least two kits, estimated to be eight weeks old and belonging to different family groups, were seen in Knapdale Forest in Argyll. Alongside the trial, the pre-existing population of beavers along the Tay was monitored and assessed.

Following receipt of the results of the Scottish Beaver Trial, in November 2016 the Scottish Government announced that beavers could remain permanently, and would be given protected status as a native species within Scotland. Beavers will be allowed to extend their range naturally from Knapdale and the River Tay, however to aid this process and improve the health and resilience of the population a further 28 beavers will be released in Knapdale between 2017 and 2020. A survey of beaver numbers during the winter of 2017-18 estimated that the Tayside population had increased to between 300 and 550 beavers, with beavers now also present in the catchment of the River Forth, and the Trossachs area.

Reintroduction into England and Wales 
A group of three beavers was spotted on the River Otter in Devon in 2013, apparently successfully bearing three kits the next year. Following concern from local landowners and anglers, as well as farmers worrying that the beavers could carry disease, the government announced that it would capture the beavers and place them in a zoo or wildlife park. A sport-fishing industry lobbyist group, the Angling Trust, said, "it would be irresponsible even to consider reintroducing this species into the wild without first restoring our rivers to good health." These actions were protested by local residents and campaign groups, with environmental journalist George Monbiot describing the government and anglers as 'control freaks': "I'm an angler, and the Angling Trust does not represent me on this issue...most anglers, in my experience, have a powerful connection with nature. The chance of seeing remarkable wild animals while waiting quietly on the riverbank is a major part of why we do it." On 28 January 2015, Natural England declared that the beavers would be allowed to remain on condition that they were free of disease and of Eurasian descent. These conditions were found to be met on 23 March 2015, following the capture and testing of five of the beavers. DNA testing showed that the animals were the once-native Eurasian beaver, and none of the beavers was found to be infected with Echinococcus multilocularis, tularaemia, or bovine TB. On 24 June 2015, video footage from local filmmaker Tom Buckley was featured on the BBC news website showing one of the wild Devon females with two live young.

A study has been undertaken on the feasibility and desirability of a reintroduction of beavers to Wales by a partnership including the Wildlife Trusts, Countryside Council for Wales, Peoples Trust for Endangered Species, Environment Agency Wales, Wild Europe, and Forestry Commission Wales, with additional funding from Welsh Power Ltd. The resulting reports were published in 2012 with the launch of the Welsh Beaver Project, which is a partnership led by the Wildlife in Wales, and are downloadable from www.welshbeaverproject.org. A 2009 report by Natural England, the government's conservation body, and the People's Trust for Endangered Species recommended that beavers be reintroduced to the wild in England. This goal was realised in November 2016, when beavers were recognised as a British native species. In October 2022, this animal was recognized as a European protected species in England, which legally protected it from being captured, killed, injured, hunted, or disturbed. This decision also limited damaging beaver's dams and burrows.

In captivity 
In 2001, the Kent Wildlife Trust with the Wildwood Trust and Natural England imported two families of Eurasian beavers from Norway to manage a wetland nature reserve. This project pioneered the use of beavers as a wildlife conservation tool in the UK. The success of this project has provided the inspiration behind other projects in Gloucestershire and Argyll. The Kent beaver colony lives in a  fenced enclosure at the wetland of Ham Fen. Subsequently, the population has been supplemented in 2005 and 2008. The beavers continue to help restore the wetland by rehydrating the soils. Six Eurasian beavers were released in 2005 into a fenced lakeside area in Gloucestershire. In 2007, a specially selected group of four Bavarian beavers was released into a fenced enclosure in the Martin Mere nature reserve in Lancashire. The beavers hopefully will form a permanent colony, and the younger pair will be transferred to another location when the adults begin breeding again. The progress of the group will be followed as part of the BBC's Autumnwatch television series. On 19 November 2011, a pair of beaver sisters was released into a  enclosure at Blaeneinion, A colony of beavers is also established in a large enclosure at Bamff, Perthshire.

In June 2017, a pair of beavers was released into a secured area in Cornwall near Ladock, called The Beaver Project.
In July 2018 two Eurasian beavers were released into a fenced area  in size surrounding Greathough Brook near Lydbrook in the Forest of Dean. The UK Government hopes that the presence of the beavers on Forestry Commission land will help to alleviate flooding in a natural way as the animals will construct dams and ponds, slowing the flow of water in the area. The village of Lydbrook was badly affected by flooding in 2012.

The then Environment Secretary Michael Gove, who attended the release, said:
"The beaver has a special place in English heritage and the Forest of Dean. This release is a fantastic opportunity to develop our understanding of the potential impacts of reintroductions and help this iconic species, 400 years after it was driven to extinction."

References

External links 

 Scottish Beaver Trial

Beavers
Mammals described in 1758
Mammals of Asia
Rodents of Europe
Mammals of Mongolia
Mammals of Russia
Taxa named by Carl Linnaeus